Dimitriev is a surname. Notable people with the surname include:

 Artur Dimitriev (born 1968), Russian pair skater
 Emil Dimitriev (born 1979), Macedonian politician and sociologist
 Radko Dimitriev (1859–1918), Bulgarian general

See also
 Dimitrie